Morcom may refer to:
Morcom Township, St. Louis County, Minnesota
Morcom International